Damrongia is a genus of flowering plants in the Gesneriad family, centered in Thailand and found in southern China, Southeast Asia, and Sumatra. Species were reassigned to it in 2016 in a revision of Loxocarpinae.

Species
Currently accepted species include:

Damrongia burmanica (Craib) C.Puglisi
Damrongia clarkeana (Hemsl.) C.Puglisi
Damrongia cyanea (Ridl.) D.J.Middleton & A.Weber
Damrongia fulva (Barnett) D.J.Middleton & A.Weber
Damrongia integra (Barnett) D.J.Middleton & A.Weber
Damrongia lacunosa (Hook.f.) D.J.Middleton & A.Weber
Damrongia orientalis (Craib) C.Puglisi
Damrongia purpureolineata Kerr ex Craib
Damrongia sumatrana (B.L.Burtt) C.Puglisi
Damrongia tribounii C.Puglisi
Damrongia trisepala (Barnett) D.J.Middleton & A.Weber

References

Didymocarpoideae
Gesneriaceae genera
Taxa named by William Grant Craib